Pat Boone Sings Winners of the Reader's Digest Poll is a studio album by Pat Boone, released in 1965 on Dot Records.

Track listing

References 

1965 albums
Pat Boone albums
Dot Records albums
Albums produced by Randy Wood (record producer)